John Morris Jones Walkway is a path on the River Cole in Hall Green, Birmingham, England (in an area once called Sarehole). It is part of the Shire Country Park.

John Morris Jones was a headmaster of George Dixon Junior School in west Birmingham from 1960 to 1980. He wrote extensively about the local history of the South Birmingham area, particularly Yardley, Hall Green and Sarehole.

See also 
 Hall Green and Hereabout, John Morris JONES, ed. Michael Byrne 1989, (Birmingham Libraries Catalogue)
  Here and Then - The past of Our District, John Morris JONES, (Birmingham Libraries Catalogue)

External links
 Birmingham Grid for Learning - John Morris Jones Collection
 Birmingham Grid for Learning - very detailed text on Sarehole Mill by John Morris JONES
 Shire Country Park

Footpaths in the West Midlands (county)